Galmic is a drug which acts as a selective, non-peptide agonist at the galanin receptors GALR. It has anticonvulsant, antidepressant and analgesic effects in animal studies, but also inhibits memory functions.

References

Neuropeptides
Oxazoles